Semnoz is a mountain of Haute-Savoie, France. It lies in the Bauges range.

Tour de France
The penultimate stage of the 2013 Tour de France (Stage 20) saw a summit finish on Semnoz,  after departing from Annecy. The mountain has featured in the Tour previously, but this was during a neutralized stage in the wake of the 1998 Festina affair.

Details of the climb
The Crêt de Chatillon can be reached by road from three directions.

From the west, the climb commences at Quintal and uses the D241 before reaching the D41 after . This is the route used on Stage 20 of the 2013 Tour de France and is ranked as an Hors catégorie climb. The route to the summit from the start at Annecy crosses the Col de Leschaux after  before descending to Saint-Jean-d'Arvey.

References

Cycling Le Semnoz Map, Profiles, Photos 

 

Mountains of Haute-Savoie
Mountains of the Alps